Fors seulement is a French chanson, popular as a basis for variations and as a cantus firmus. An early version, attributed to Johannes Ockeghem, is sometimes called Fors seulement l'attente to distinguish it from his similarly titled Fors seulement contre.

Brumel wrote a polytextual version, combining a tenor setting of Du tout plongiet with the words and superius from Ockeghem's Fors seulement l'attente for baritone.

Lyrics

Versions and settings 
Many versions of the chanson were produced including those by Johannes Ockeghem, Josquin des Prez, Pierre de La Rue, Matthaeus Pipelare, Johannes Ghiselin, Jacob Obrecht, Antoine Brumel, Jheronimus Vinders and Alexander Agricola.

Mass settings include those by Vinders, Ockeghem, Obrecht, Pipelare, and Carpentras.

References 
 George H Black (2003). Matthaeus Pipelare’s Fors Seulement (II) Chanson and its Related Motet and Mass Performance Editions and Commentary. DMA thesis. Louisiana State Univ. (online, PDF, 3,13 MB)

Notes 

Renaissance chansons